The Lone Star Baptist Church, also known as the Redfield Historical Society Building, is a historic building at 620 Sheridan Road in Redfield, Arkansas.

The building's exterior is noted for its minimal decoration, and it was nominated for inclusion on the National Register of Historic Places because it is an excellent example of an early twentieth century rural church. It was listed on the National Register in 2005.

History
A local African-American Baptist congregation formed in 1890, and the church was built in 1901. The church was used as a school until material became available to build a school. The church operated until 1976. Church members deeded the building to the City of Redfield in 1993. The Redfield Historical Society maintains the building, and it is used for historical society meetings, weddings, public tours by appointment, and holiday choir performances.

See also
 National Register of Historic Places listings in Jefferson County, Arkansas

References

External links
 

1901 establishments in Arkansas
African-American history of Arkansas
Churches completed in 1901
Former Baptist church buildings in the United States
Former churches in Arkansas
Government buildings on the National Register of Historic Places in Arkansas
Historical societies in Arkansas
Local government buildings in the United States
National Register of Historic Places in Redfield, Arkansas
Relocated buildings and structures in Arkansas
Wooden churches in Arkansas